Robert Ismael Ergas Moreno (born 15 January 1998) is an Uruguayan footballer who plays as either a left back or a left winger for Club Olimpia, on loan from Defensor Sporting.

Club career
Born in Montevideo, Ergas joined Defensor Sporting's youth setup at the age of 12, after representing Club América de Baby Fútbol and Club Atlético Alumni. In April 2015, he went on a trial at Manchester United, but nothing came of it as Defensor refused an offer from the Red Devils; subsequently, he spent almost a year sidelined due to a knee injury.

Ergas made his first team – and Primera División – debut on 5 February 2017, coming on as a late substitute for Matías Cabrera in a 1–0 home win against Rampla Juniors. For the 2018 season, he was loaned to fellow top-tier side Boston River.

Upon returning, Ergas was included in the main squad, but appeared sparingly. On 6 August 2019, he moved abroad after agreeing to a one-year loan deal with Segunda División side Albacete Balompié.

After mainly appearing for Alba's reserve team, Ergas returned to Uruguay and joined C.A. Rentistas on loan. On 23 October 2020, Ergas joined Paraguayan club Club Olimpia on loan until 31 December 2021 with an buying option.

References

External links

1998 births
Living people
Footballers from Montevideo
Uruguayan footballers
Uruguayan expatriate footballers
Association football defenders
Association football wingers
Uruguayan Primera División players
Paraguayan Primera División players
Segunda División players
Tercera División players
Defensor Sporting players
Boston River players
C.A. Rentistas players
Atlético Albacete players
Albacete Balompié players
Club Olimpia footballers
Uruguay youth international footballers
Uruguayan expatriate sportspeople in Spain
Uruguayan expatriate sportspeople in Paraguay
Expatriate footballers in Spain
Expatriate footballers in Paraguay